Lock Up is an English grindcore supergroup, originally formed by Shane Embury (Napalm Death, Venomous Concept), Nicholas Barker (ex-Cradle of Filth, Dimmu Borgir) and Jesse Pintado (Napalm Death, Terrorizer). Lock Up was joined by Peter Tägtgren (Hypocrisy) for its debut album, 1999's Pleasures Pave Sewers, and Tomas Lindberg (At the Gates, Disfear) for 2002's Hate Breeds Suffering and a Japanese tour.

The band was later joined by guitarist Anton Reisenegger (Pentagram Chile and Criminal) in place of the late Pintado. 

Lock Up have played very few live shows. In 2009, the band announced that they would play the Damnation Festival that year. The line-up featured Embury, Barker, Lindberg and Reisenegger. It was touted as the band's last live show; however, they later booked more shows for 2010 and 2012. During February of that year, they scheduled a ten show mini-tour in the United States. It was their first time playing in that country. Shane Embury was unable to make the shows so Danny Lilker from Nuclear Assault filled in on bass for the duration of the trek.

On 3 December 2010, Lock Up uploaded the first new piece of music in eight years, a track titled "Life of Devastation", to the band's official MySpace page. The song is set to appear on a split seven-inch single with Misery Index in 2011.

The band's third studio album, Necropolis Transparent, was recorded in November and December 2010 at HVR Studios in Ipswich, England, and features guest appearances by Peter Tägtgren and Jeff Walker (Carcass, Brujeria). It was released on 1 July in Europe and 12 July in North America by Nuclear Blast Records. 

The fourth album, Demonization, was released in March 2017 through Listenable Records. This time Kevin Sharp (Brutal Truth, Venomous Concept) handled the vocals.

In April 2020, it was announced that drummer Nick Barker had left the band. He was replaced by Adam Jarvis less than a month later. In February 2021, it was announced former vocalist Tomas Lindberg had rejoined the band and would handle vocal duties together with current vocalist Kevin Sharp.

Members
Current
Shane Embury – bass (1998–present)
Tomas Lindberg – vocals (2002–2014, 2021–present)
Anton Reisenegger – guitar (2006–present)
Kevin Sharp – vocals (2014–present)
Adam Jarvis – acoustic drums (2020–present)

Former
Nicholas Barker – acoustic drums (1998–2020)
Jesse Pintado – guitar (1998–2006)
Peter Tägtgren – vocals (1998–2002)

Touring musicians
Barry Savage – guitar (2002)
Danny Lilker – bass (2012)

Timeline

Discography
 Pleasures Pave Sewers (1999)
 Hate Breeds Suffering (2002)
 Necropolis Transparent (2011)
 Demonization (2017)
 The Dregs of Hades (2021)

References

External links
Steve Huey. Lock Up Biography. AllMusic.

Musical groups established in 1998
Deathgrind musical groups
Nuclear Blast artists
English heavy metal musical groups